Peter Popham (born 10 January 1952) is an English journalist, author, and playwright. He is best known for his journalism at The Independent from 1990 to 2016, and his books on Aung San Suu Kyi.

Early life
Popham was born in Cork, Ireland, in 1952. His father was the poet, novelist, and military historian Hugh Popham. Raised in Richmond, Surrey, he was educated at Latymer Upper School, where he edited the school magazine, and was a contributor to the notorious ‘Schoolkids Issue’ of the underground magazine, Oz.

Education and early career
At the University of Leeds, where he read English, he edited Poetry and Audience, the university's long-established poetry magazine, and launched Leeds Larynx, a cultural review. His first fiction to be published was "Collision and Goodbye", a short story, in Transatlantic Review no. 55/56, in May 1976.

After working in theatres in Leeds, London and Bristol and writing more plays, in 1977 he moved to Japan, where after teaching English for two years he became a freelance journalist and wrote his first book, Tokyo: the City at the End of the World, published by Kodansha International in 1985.

At The Independent
In 1990 he joined the staff of the British newspaper The Independent as feature writer on The Independent Magazine under Alexander Chancellor. In 1997 he was appointed South Asia correspondent of the newspaper and moved to Delhi. While living in Delhi he drafted his novel Across the Great Divide, set before and after India's independence and partition. In 2002 he moved to Italy to become the Rome correspondent.

In 2011 his study of Aung San Suu Kyi, The Lady and the Peacock, was published by Random House. It was translated into Dutch, Japanese, Korean, Chinese and Mongolian and published in the USA by The Experiment. A pirated edition appeared in Burma, on sale at the headquarters of Suu Kyi's party, the National League for Democracy, in Yangon. His sequel, The Lady and the Generals, was published by Penguin Random House in 2016.

Since leaving The Independent in 2016 he has written several plays, including The Kingdom of Heaven, performed at the Script Room in London in February 2019, and Savages, in a Zoom production directed by Sebastian Michael and starring Tim Bentinck, in July 2020.

Selected works

References

British journalists
1952 births
Living people
Alumni of the University of Leeds
People educated at Latymer Upper School